The Story of Tracy Beaker is a British children's drama media franchise that focuses on the lives and experiences of young people and their care workers in care. The franchise began with the publication of The Story of Tracy Beaker on 14 February 1991. Since then, the franchise has had six further books, three television series and their spin-offs, a television movie, a Children In Need special, a musical and two magazine collections. The Story of Tracy Beaker merchandise has also been released.

Publications
The Story of Tracy Beaker franchise currently has seven books. The books are The Story of Tracy Beaker, The Dare Game (reissued in 2018 as I Dare You, Tracy Beaker) Starring Tracy Beaker, My Mum Tracy Beaker, We Are The Beaker Girls, Tracy Beaker's Thumping Heart and Ask Tracy Beaker and Friends.

The Story of Tracy Beaker also had two magazine collections. Totally Tracy Beaker came with free art and craft supplies, which the reader collected, and the second magazine released, The Story of Tracy Beaker: The DVD collection, came with a DVD with episodes from the series and the reader would eventually have all five series.

Television

The BBC adapted the book for television and The Story of Tracy Beaker ran for five series on CBBC from 8 January 2002 to 9 December 2005, featuring Dani Harmer as Tracy Beaker. In 2009, a spin-off from The Story of Tracy Beaker, was announced called Beaker's Back, but the show was changed to Tracy Beaker Returns and it aired on CBBC for three series from 8 January 2010 to 23 March 2012. In 2012, a spin-off from Tracy Beaker Returns called The Dumping Ground was announced as Harmer chose to quit her role as Tracy and has aired on CBBC since 4 January 2013; it is currently in its ninth  series.

On 21 February 2004, Tracy Beaker: The Movie of Me aired on CBBC. For Children In Need that year, a The Story of Tracy Beaker special aired on CBBC titled Tracy Beaker Parties With Pudsey. Tracy Beaker Returns aired one spin-off, Tracy Beaker Survival Files, which aired for one series from 16 December 2011 to 6 January 2012. The Dumping Ground currently has had five spin-off's: The Dumping Ground Survival Files aired for two series from 6 January to 12 December 2014, a webisode miniseries Liam's Story aired from 17 January to 14 March 2018 and the series aired as a full episode on CBBC on 23 March 2014, a five-part miniseries called The Dumping Ground Dish Up aired in November 2015, The Dumping Ground: I'm..., another webisode series where young people and staff describe living and working in care, aired for two series from 25 January 2016 to 9 February 2017. A five-part mini webisode series, Sasha's Contact Meetings, was released on 6 April 2018.

Musicals
In 2006, The Story of Tracy Beaker was adapted into a musical, featuring Sarah Churm as Tracy Beaker. Suzie McGrath played Justine Littlewood, Jessica Martin played Tracy's mum and Louise, Alice Redmond played Tracy's foster mother Cam, Gemma Page played social worker Elaine, and Andy Steed played Peter.

Cast

References

Tracy Beaker series
The Story of Tracy Beaker
The Dumping Ground
Television series by BBC Studios